This is a list of notable earthquakes that had epicentres in Spain, or significantly affected the country.

Geology
Spain lies on the Eurasian Plate just to the north of its boundary with the African Plate. The southernmost part of Spain is the zone with the highest seismicity in the country. The African Plate is obliquely converging with the Eurasian Plate at about 5 mm/year.

Earthquakes

See also
Geology of Spain 
Azores–Gibraltar Transform Fault

References

External links 

 Catálogo sísmico de la Península Ibérica (880 a. C.-1900) Earthquake Catalogue for the Iberian Peninsula (880 BC–1900 AD) (in Spanish)
 Earthquakes in Spain, Iberia Nature 

Spain
Earthquakes
 
Earthquakes